The Nanling, also known as the Wuling, is a major mountain range in Southern China that separates the Pearl River Basin from the Yangtze Valley and serves as the dividing line between south and central subtropical zones.

There are trough basins in the Nanling, the most of the western basins in Nanling Mountains are composed of limestone, where karst regions are located. the most of the eastern basins are made up of red sandstone, where are danxia landform areas. The Nanling are boundaries between the four provinces of Guangdong, Guangxi, Hunan and Jiangxi, and also the cultural boundaries, on the south of the mountains are Lingnan culture area.

The Nanling is a corridor where Chinese ethnic groups migrate and also the land of national amalgamation. In the Nanling, there form trough corridors, tectonic fault basins or watersheds, where are relatively low and not difficult to climb, between the natural gorge channels and the river systems in the north and south of the Nanling are natural channels, people-to-people exchanges are easy. Since the Qin dynasty, from the Central Plains into Lingnan (the south of the Nanling) there have been five ancient roads, which are YuechengLing Road(), Mengzhuling Road, Qitianling Road, Lingling-Guiyang Path and Dayuling Road. At the same time, many tributaries of the Yangtze system and Pearl River system have also formed west to east passages.

The Nanling mountains are a regional biodiversity hot spot for endemic species of plants, birds and amphibians.

Ranges
The five mountain ranges that make up the Nanling are the:

Yuecheng Mountains 
Dupang Mountains 
Mengzhu Mountains
Qitian Mountains 
Dayu Mountains

The Nanling Mountains separate Central China from South China. Areas south of the ranges are tropical in climate, permitting two crops of white rice to be grown each year.

Ion adsorption clays are mined by open-pit methods in the Nanling region, and form a major source of rare earth elements in the world.

See also 
 Haiyang Mountains 
 Jiuyi Mountains
 Mount Danxia

References

Mountain ranges of China
Geography of Central China
Geography of South China
Mountain ranges of Hunan
Mountains of Guangdong
Landforms of Guangxi
Mining communities in China